Theodor Hoffmann (27 February 1935 – 1 November 2018) was an East German Admiral who served as the head of the People's Navy (Volksmarine) and as the last Minister of National Defense of the German Democratic Republic and head of the National People's Army.

Early life
Hoffmann worked from 1949 to 1951 in agriculture. From 1951 to 1952, Hoffmann was a Pioneer Leader in the Wismar District Free German Youth (FDJ).

Military career

In 1952, Hoffmann became a sailor in the Sea Police (Seepolizei), which would later become the East German People's Navy (Volksmarine). He attended the Officers School of the People's Police at Stralsund and joined the Socialist Unity Party of Germany in 1956. From 1960 to 1963, he attended the Soviet Naval War Academy in Leningrad and earned a diploma in military science, which he subsequently used to hold various senior positions in the 6th Fleet of the People's Navy. From 1971 to 1974, he was chief of the 6th Fleet with the rank of frigate captain. He later became deputy chief of staff for operational work in the People's Navy command. In 1985, he was appointed deputy chief of the People's Navy and chief of staff.  In 1987, was appointed chief of the People's Navy (who is also Deputy Minister of National Defense) in the rank of vice admiral (two stars).

He was promoted to admiral (three stars) and replaced Heinz Kessler as the Minister for National Defence and head of the National People's Army, serving from 18 November 1989 to 23 April 1990. After his initial selection, Hoffmann was told by the outgoing Defence Minister (Army General Heinz Keßler) that he would be promoted to Generaloberst (colonel-general) in the army; Hoffmann refused to switch services, however, and obtained approval from Egon Krenz (Erich Honecker’s successor) to remain a naval admiral. After the free 1990 elections, he was succeeded in the ministry by CDU politician Rainer Eppelmann (now called Minister for Disarmament and Defense), but remained commander of the National People's Army until its disbandment and incorporation into the Bundeswehr.

In 1993, Hoffmann published his reminiscences of last days of the National People's Army, Das letzte Kommando; Ein Minister erinnert sich. In 1995 he published his autobiography Kommando Ostsee; Vom Matrosen zum Admiral.

Personal life
Hoffmann married Helga Qualo in October 1957, and had two sons: Norbert (born in 1958) and Rene (born in 1965). Hoffmann died on 1 November 2018 at the age of 83.

Awards and medals

Over his life, Hoffmann received the following awards:

Patriotic Order of Merit
Scharnhorst Order
Combat Order for Merit for the Nation and Fatherland - Silver
Distinguished Service Medal of the National People's Army - Gold
Medal for Loyal Service in the Shipping Industry - Silver
Medal Brotherhood in Arms - Gold
Medal "For Strengthening of Brotherhood in Arms"
Jubilee Medal 30 Years of the National People's Army

References

Bibliography 
Klaus Froh, Rüdiger Wenzke: Die Generale und Admirale der NVA. Ein biographisches Handbuch. 4. Auflage. Ch. Links, Berlin 2000, .

External links

Wer war wer in der DDR?
Admiral Dipl.-Mil. Theodor Hoffmann by Shawn Bohannon

1935 births
2018 deaths
People from Ludwigslust-Parchim
Socialist Unity Party of Germany politicians
Ministers of National Defence (East Germany)
Admirals of the Volksmarine
Recipients of the Scharnhorst Order
N. G. Kuznetsov Naval Academy alumni